The Col du Grand Ballon (elevation ) is a mountain pass situated close to the summit of the Grand Ballon in the Vosges Mountains of France. It connects Cernay (Haut-Rhin) with  Le Markstein winter sports station.

Details of the climbs
 
There are several different directions from which the Col du Grand Ballon can be climbed:

This route follows the Route des Crêtes over  the Col de Herrenfluh after . After a short descent, the road climbs again to the Col de Silberloch before descending to the Col Amic. From here, there remain  at an average of 7.6%. In the forest on this final section, there are two short paved stretches.  from the summit, the gradient increases to over 8%.

This route joins that from Cernay at the Col Amic.

From the south it is also possible to climb on minor roads from Saint-Amarin or Moosch, both on the N66; these routes join together at Geishouse.

From Soultz (east), the route follows a minor road for the first  at a steady average gradient of 4.6%, before joining the other routes at Col Amic.

This climb joins the D431 at Le Markstein.

Tour de France
The Tour de France first crossed over the Col du Grand Ballon in 1969, when the leader over the summit was Lucien Van Impe. It has been crossed on a further six occasions, the most recent in 2014.

Tour de France Femmes
The col was crossed on Stage 7 of the 2022 Tour de France Femmes.

Amateur cycling
The Col du Grand Ballon is also used by amateur cyclists on the "Trois Ballons" sportive ride held in June (together with the climbs over the Ballon d'Alsace and the Ballon de Servance).

References

External links 
Col du Grand Ballon on Google Maps (Tour de France classic climbs)

Mountain passes of Grand Est
Transport in Grand Est
Grand Ballon